O'Donnel River is a river located in the Atlin Country region of British Columbia. The river was first recorded in 1898 and was originally known as Moose River or Caribou River. In 1912 a rich gold streak was discovered in the river, which attracted many miners. The river has been sluiced, drifted, and hydraulicked.

References

Rivers of British Columbia
Atlin District